Chuck BB (born 1981) is an American comic book creator, best known for his work on Spider-Man, Fear Agent, and Oni's Black Metal.

Published works
Chuck BB's works include:
The Art of Boom! Studios (Boom! Studios, 2011)
Black Metal (Oni Press, 2007)
CBGB (Image Comics, 2010)
Drink and Draw Social Club (2010)
Fear Agent (Image Comics, 2005)
Flight (2004)
New Avengers (2010)PopGun (Image Comics, 2007)Secret Skull (IDW, 2004)Spider-Island: I Love New York City (Marvel Comics, 2011)Spider-Man: Spider-Island Companion (Marvel Comics, 2012)Steve Niles Omnibus (2008)Wasteland (2006)Western Tales of Terror (2004)

Recognition
2008 Chuck BB, Black Metal'' (artist, Oni)

References

External links

Living people
Artists from California
1981 births
Writers from California